State Route 206 (SR 206) is a short state route in the U.S. state of Maine. It is located entirely in Washington and runs from SR 17 to SR 105. At  in length, it is the shortest primary state highway in Maine.

Route description
SR 206 begins at the intersection of SR 17 and Valley Road on the western side of the Town of Washington. It runs north on West Washington Road through western Washington through a mostly wooded landscape but many homes that line the road have clearings for small farming activities. The state route ends at a T-intersection with SR 105 continuing north and east from this intersection.

Junction list

References

External links

Floodgap Roadgap's RoadsAroundME: Maine State Route 206

206
Transportation in Knox County, Maine